The list of ship launches in 1729 includes a chronological list of some ships launched in 1729.


References

1729
Ship launches